Henhen Herdiana (born 10 September 1995) is an Indonesian professional footballer who plays as a right-back for Liga 1 club Persib Bandung.

Club career

Early career
Henhen is a footballer from Subang, West Java. He started his junior football career with joined Bareti Ciater soccer school. On 2014, Henhen joined Diklat Persib.

On 2016, Henhen joined  PON Football Team of West Java, and managed to get a gold medal at the football branch 2016 Pekan Olahraga Nasional in West Java.

Persib Bandung
He made his professional debut in the Liga 1 on 15 April 2017 against Persib.

Career statistics

Club

References

External links
 

Living people
1995 births
Indonesian footballers
People from Bandung
Sportspeople from Bandung
Sportspeople from West Java
Liga 1 (Indonesia) players
Persib Bandung players
Association football defenders